Sir Matthew Ingle Joyce (17 July 1839 – 10 March 1930) was a British judge. He was a Justice of the Chancery Division of the High Court between 1900 and 1915.

Born in Breedon on the Hill, Leicestershire, he was educated at Ashby-de-la-Zouch Grammar School and Gonville and Caius College, Cambridge, where he graduated eighth wrangler in 1862. The same year he was elected to a fellowship at Caius, which he held until 1875.

He was called to the bar by Lincoln's Inn in 1865. At the bar his pupils included the future Lord Parker of Waddington and Lord Russell of Killowen.

He was junior equity counsel to the Treasury from 1886 to 1900, when he was appointed a Justice of the High Court, assigned to the Chancery Division, and received the customary knighthood. He retired in 1915, and was sworn of the Privy Council.

Joyce married Miriam Bertha Jackson, daughter of Sir William Jackson, 1st Baronet, in 1891; they had one daughter.

Notable cases 

 Colls v Home and Colonial Stores

References 

Knights Bachelor
Chancery Division judges
English barristers
Members of Lincoln's Inn
Members of the Privy Council of the United Kingdom
Alumni of Gonville and Caius College, Cambridge
Fellows of Gonville and Caius College, Cambridge
1839 births
1930 deaths